The Lake Rukwa lampeye (Micropanchax fuelleborni) is a species of fish in the family Poeciliidae. Its natural habitats are intermittent rivers, freshwater marshes, and intermittent freshwater marshes. It is threatened by habitat loss. This species occurs in central Africa in Lake Rukwa, Tanzania, the Malagarasi River, Wembere River system and the upper basin of the Congo River. Its specific name honours the German physician and zoologist Friedrich Fülleborn (1866-1933), who collected the type.

References

Lake Rukwa lampeye
Freshwater fish of Tanzania
Lake Rukwa lampeye
Taxonomy articles created by Polbot
Taxobox binomials not recognized by IUCN